David Hodges (born September 15, 1968) is an American businessman and former professional rugby union player and coach. His current role within rugby is uncertain following his last employer, the Austin Gilgronis, being expelled from the MLR.
 He was an American rugby union coach of the United States national rugby union team, the Eagles. Hodges is a former professional rugby union player, professional, collegiate American football player, and collegiate American football coach. Hodges was captain of the U.S. national rugby team for 28 matches, a U.S. record that stood until 2013. Since retiring from the international game, Dave has had a long run of bad fortune in the business of rugby. He was let go from Rhino Rugby as the Vice President of Sales, let go from USA Rugby after a woeful 2019 Rugby World Cup as the Men's National Team General Manager, and more recently has found himself out of work after his most recent employer, the Austin Gilgronis, we're expelled from the MLR.

High school and collegiate years
Hodges played American football at Long Beach Wilson High School in Long Beach, California, as a linebacker. It was during this period that Hodges saw his first rugby match as Belmont Shore Rugby Club practiced and played their matches on the same field that Hodges' high school team played football.

Hodges played American football throughout his college years at Occidental College in Los Angeles, California and received accolades in each of his four collegiate seasons. Hodges was named a Kodak All-American football player, an award given annually to the best American college football players at their respective positions.

Hodges began playing rugby at 18 as a freshman at Occidental College. Within two years, Hodges was named as a Collegiate All-American in 1990 and 1991. Teammates and opponents speak highly of his leadership and athleticism. Greg Jenkins, a teammate said, "He's (Hodges) a leader--a great athlete with leverage, agility and aggressiveness. No one can match his ability. He's pretty much in a league of his own."

US national rugby team

Hodges was capped 54 times by the United States national rugby union team at lock, flanker and at number eight. He made his debut as a substitute against Uruguay in 1996 at Fletcher's Fields in Markham, Ontario, Canada.

Hodges was the U.S. national team Captain 27 times during 2000 through 2003. Hodges won the USA Rugby Athlete of the Year in 2005.

A match between the United States and France on July 3, 2004, marked the final game that Hodges represented the United States as a player. After nine years of service to the Eagles, Hodges explained his decision to retire. "I think now is the right time. I'm still playing at a high level and I think I wanted to be a part of the team, as long as I was selected, and of the transition . . . We’re building for the next World Cup and so the more I stay around, that’s one less guy in the XV that coach has experience for the next World Cup."

Professional rugby career

Hodges played professional rugby with Llanelli RFC from 1997–1999 and 2001–2005. Hodges played for Bridgend RFC in 1999–2000. In 2001 and 2002, he was named Player of the Year for the Llanelli Scarlets. He was also the strength coach for the Llanelli Scarlets from 2001–2004. When Hodges announced his retirement from playing professional rugby, Llanelli Scarlets chief executive Stuart Gallacher said, "David has been a highly influential member of our squad for seven years. He is a real professional."

In 2009, Hodges was named Player of the Decade (2000–2009) by Rugby Magazine.

Coaching career

Rugby union

USA Rugby (2009–2012)
USA Eagles Assistant Coach, Forwards and Performance Analyst

Head coach (2007–2009) Denver Barbarians Rugby Club, a USA Rugby Super League team, based in Denver, Colorado.

USA Rugby (2005–2006)
High Performance Manager
Assistant US National Team Coach
Head Coach, USA Rugby Collegiate All-Americans
Game Development Officer, High School Administrative Model

Strength coach: for the Scarlets (2001–2004)

American football

Greenville College: Defensive backs coach (1994)
Hamburg Blue Devils: Player/coach (1993–1994)
Macalester College: Defensive coordinator (1990–1993)

Honors

Rugby union
 2009 USA Rugby Union Player of the Decade (Rugby Magazine)
 1996–2004 USA NATIONAL TEAM 54 Times
 2001–2002 Llanelli Scarlets Player of the Year
 2000-2003 USA NATIONAL TEAM CAPTAIN 27 Times
 1995–1997 Member of 1996 National Championship team OMBAC
 1990, 1991 All-American Collegiate XV

American football
 1989 Kodak All American
 1989 MVP All Southern California Intercollegiate Athlete Conference
 1986–89 All-Southern California Intercollegiate Athlete Conference Team

References

Living people
Scarlets players
American rugby union players
United States international rugby union players
1968 births
Rugby union coaches from California
Rugby union locks
Rugby union flankers
Rugby union number eights
Occidental College alumni
Sportspeople from Long Beach, California
Players of American football from Long Beach, California
Footballers who switched code